95179 Berkó, provisional designation , is a Massalian asteroid from the inner regions of the asteroid belt, approximately  in diameter.

The likely S-type asteroid was discovered on 16 January 2002, by Hungarian astronomers Krisztián Sárneczky and Zsuzsanna Heiner at the Konkoly Observatory's Piszkéstető Station northeast of Budapest, Hungary, and later named after Hungarian amateur astronomer Ernő Berkó.

Orbit and classification 

Berkó is an attributed member of the Massalia family, a large family of more than 6000 known asteroids, named after 20 Massalia, the family's parent body.

The asteroid orbits the Sun in the inner main belt at a distance of 1.9–2.9 AU once every 3 years and 9 months (1,355 days; semi-major axis of 2.4 AU). Its orbit has an eccentricity of 0.20 and an inclination of 2° with respect to the ecliptic. The first observation was made at Lincoln Laboratory's Experimental Test Site in August 2000, extending the body's observation arc by 17 months prior to its official discovery observation at Piszkéstető.

Physical characteristics 

Berkó has an absolute magnitude of 16.5. While its spectral type has not been determined, it is likely an S-type asteroid due to its membership to the Massalia family. As of 2018, its effective size, composition and albedo, as well as its rotation period, poles and shape remain unknown.

Based on an assumed albedo of 0.21 – derived from 20 Massalia, the Massalia family's parent body, Berkó measures 1.4 kilometers in diameter using an absolute magnitude of 16.5.

Naming 

This minor planet is named after Ernő Berkó (born 1955), a Hungarian amateur astronomer and independent discoverer of the supernova , as well as an observer of deep-sky objects and double stars. As of 2006, he has contributed to the WDS catalog with the discovery of more than 160 double stars. The official naming citation was published by the Minor Planet Center on 6 January 2007.

References

External links 
 Dictionary of Minor Planet Names, Google books
 Discovery Circumstances: Numbered Minor Planets (95001)-(100000) – Minor Planet Center
 
 

095179
Discoveries by Krisztián Sárneczky
Discoveries by Zsuzsanna Heiner
Named minor planets
20020116